Photinula virginalis is a species of sea snail, a marine gastropod mollusk, in the family Calliostomatidae within the superfamily Trochoidea, the top snails, turban snails and their allies.

Description
The length of the shell attains 17.3 mm.

Distribution
This marine species occurs off Patagonia.

References

External links
 Rochebrune A.T. de & Mabille J. (1889). Mollusques. in: Mission Scientifique du Cap Horn 1882-1883. Tome 6 (Zoologie 2, part 8). Paris, Gauthiers-Villars. H.1-H.129, pls. 1-8.

Calliostomatidae